Egon Freiherr von Eickstedt (April 10, 1892 – December 20, 1965) was a German physical anthropologist who classified humanity into races. His study in the classification of human races made him one of the leading racial theorists of Nazi Germany.

Early life
Egon Freiherr von Eickstedt was born on April 10, 1892 in Jersitz, Province of Posen.

Career
Von Eickstedt was an anthropologist. He was the author of Rassenkunde und Rassengeschichte der Menschheit (Ethnology and the Race History of Mankind).

From 1933 to 1945, he was the editor of Zeitschrift fur Rassenkunde, a German journal of racial studies, with the assistance of Hans F. K. Günther.

Racial Classification

EUROPIDE:

In Europe:

I. Northern belt of the depigmented forms:
1.) Nordide (sub-forms: Teutonordide, Dalonordide, Fennonordide)
2.) Osteuropide

II. Central belt of the brachycephals (mountain races belt; continued in Asia):
1.) Alpinide 
2.) Dinaride
3.) Lappide (europid-mongolid contact race)

III. Southern belt of the dark dolichocephals (brown races belt; continued in Asia): 
Mediterranide

In Asia:

I. Brachycephal belt:
1.) Armenide (sub-form: Anadolide)
2.) Turanide (europid-mongolid contact race)

II. Dark dolichocephal belt:

1.) Orientalide
2.) Indide (sub-forms: Nordindide, Grazilindide, Indobrachide)

MONGOLIDE:

In Asia:

1.) Tungide
2.) Sinide (sub-forms: Nordsinide, Mittelsinide, Südsinide)
3.) Palämongolide (sub-forms: Palaungide, Neside)
4.) Sibiride (sub-forms: Westsibiride, Ostsibiride)

In America:

I. Eskimide

II. Indianide:
1.) Pazifide 
2.) Silvide 
3.) Margide
4.) Zentralide
5.) Andide 
6.) Pampide 
7.) Brasilide 
8.) Lagide

NEGRIDE:

I. Negrid-Europid contact zone:
Äthiopide

II. Bush and savannah zone
1.) Nilotide
2.) Sudanide 
3.) Kafride

III. Rain forest zone:
Palänegride

ALTRASSEN:

In Africa:

I. Bambutide

II. Khoisanide: (sub-forms: Khoide, Sanide)

In Asia:

I. Ainuide

II. Weddide

III. Negritide (sub-forms: Andamanide, Semangide, Aetide)

IV. Australomelaneside:
1.) Australide (sub-form: Tasmanide)
2.) Melaneside (sub-forms: Palämelaneside, Neomelaneside, Tapiride)

V. Polyneside (Melaneside-Mongolide contact race)

VI. Indomelenide (Europide-Weddide contact race)

Death
He died on December 20, 1965.

References

External links 
 

1892 births
1965 deaths
Scientists from Poznań
Barons of Germany
German anthropologists
German military personnel of World War I
People from the Province of Posen
Historical definitions of race
20th-century anthropologists
Proponents of scientific racism